Salima Tete (born 26 December 2001) is an Indian field hockey player.

Early life and background 
Tete is from a village in the Simdega district of Jharkhand. Both her parents work as farmers. Her father also played hockey.

Career 
She made her debut for the national side in 2017 against Belarus.

At the 2018 Youth Olympic games, she was the captain of the Indian side, which went on to win a silver medal.

In 2021, she was selected in the Indian squad for the Tokyo Olympics.

References

External links

Salima Tete at Hockey India

2001 births
Living people
People from Simdega district
Field hockey players from Jharkhand
Indian female field hockey players
Field hockey players at the 2018 Summer Youth Olympics
Field hockey players at the 2020 Summer Olympics
Olympic field hockey players of India
Sportswomen from Jharkhand
Field hockey players at the 2022 Commonwealth Games
Commonwealth Games bronze medallists for India
Commonwealth Games medallists in field hockey
Medallists at the 2022 Commonwealth Games